Charles Williams (born March 12, 1992) is an American professional ice hockey player. He is currently playing under contract to the Jacksonville Icemen of the ECHL.

Early life
Williams was born in Canton, Michigan. He played college hockey at Ferris State University and Canisius College. In 2017, while playing for Canisius, Williams was named a First Team All-American, and was a selected as a finalist for the Hobey Baker Award.

Career 
On July 17, 2019, Williams continued his career in the ECHL, securing a one-year contract with the Indy Fuel.

As a free agent leading into the pandemic delayed 2020–21 season, Williams was signed by the Jacksonville Icemen of the ECHL. Before making an appearance with the club, Williams was signed to a professional tryout contract to attend the Hershey Bears training camp on January 22, 2021. He remained on the Bears roster to begin the season before he was released and returned to the Icemen on February 8, 2021.

References

External links
 
 Canisius profile

1992 births
Living people
African-American ice hockey players
AHCA Division I men's ice hockey All-Americans
American men's ice hockey goaltenders
People from Canton, Michigan
Canisius Golden Griffins men's ice hockey players
Des Moines Buccaneers players
Ferris State Bulldogs men's ice hockey players
Hartford Wolf Pack players
Indy Fuel players
Jacksonville Icemen players
Lincoln Stars players
Manchester Monarchs (ECHL) players
Ontario Reign (AHL) players
Rochester Americans players
21st-century African-American sportspeople